Sant'Angelo d'Alife is a comune (municipality) in the Province of Caserta in the Italian region Campania, located about  north of Naples and about  north of Caserta.

Sant'Angelo d'Alife borders the following municipalities: Alife, Baia e Latina, Piedimonte Matese, Pietravairano, Raviscanina, San Gregorio Matese, Valle Agricola.

Sant'Angelo d'Alife is the hometown of US singer Dion DiMucci grandfather Benedetto.

References

Cities and towns in Campania